The East African Federation is a proposed political union of the seven sovereign states of the East African Community in the African Great Lakes region Burundi, the Democratic Republic of the Congo, Kenya, Rwanda, South Sudan, Tanzania and Ugandaas a single federated sovereign state. The idea of this Federation has existed since the early 1960s, but has not yet come to fruition for a variety of reasons. In September 2018, a committee was formed to begin the process of drafting a regional constitution, and a draft constitution for the confederation was set to be written by the end of 2021 with its implementation by 2023. 

While the East African Federation has not yet been established, many steps have been taken to advance this eventual goal. Institutions and governing bodies already exist for the eventual union of these nations, with representatives from all of the related nations working together towards this common goal.

The seven nations united within the East African community are marred by political corruption and overpowering states and hindered by their incompatibilities in terms of language and ethnic divisions. The region hopes to overcome these barriers to reap the economic benefits a union could offer to this immense and growing population.

Features 
At 4,812,618 km2 (1,858,162 sq mi), the East African Federation (EAF) would be the largest country in Africa and seventh-largest in the world, replacing India. It would span the continent from the Indian Ocean to the Atlantic Ocean. With a population of 312,362,653 as of March 2022, it would also be the most populous nation in Africa and fourth in the world. Its population would be greater than that of Russia, Japan, Brazil, Mexico, and Indonesia, behind only China, India and the United States.

Swahili has been proposed as an official lingua franca. Kinshasa would be the most populous city in the proposed federation by city limits and metropolitan area, with Dar es Salaam second by population within city limits, and Nairobi second by population in the metropolitan area. The proposed capital is Arusha, a city in Tanzania close to the Kenyan border, which is also the current headquarters of the East African Community. Currently, 22% of the population within these territories lives in urban areas.

The union's proposed currency would be the East African shilling, which according to a 2013 published report is slated to become the common currency of five of the seven member countries by 2023. The GDP (Nominal) estimate would be US$240 billion making it 34th largest market in the world and the fourth largest in Africa, following Nigeria, Egypt, and South Africa. The GDP (PPP) per capita estimate is approximately 800 USD, putting the East African Federation at 156th in the world.

The President of Kenya since 2013, Uhuru Kenyatta, serves as the East African Communities lead Summit Chairperson. Betty Maina, a cabinet member for Uhuru Kenyatta in Kenya tasked as the Secretary for Industrialization, Trade and Enterprise Development in Kenya, is the current acting lead Council Chairperson. Dr. Peter Matuku Mathuki is the current acting Secretary General of the EAC, having been appointed April 25, 2021, after years of serving on the East African Business council.

Background 
In the 1920s, Colonial Secretary Leo Amery sought to create a white-ruled East African Dominion composed of Kenya, Uganda and Tanganyika. The Permanent Mandates Commission, which oversaw Tanganyika (a mandated territory), opposed Amery's plan. The plan was opposed by nonwhite populations in Africa.

Timeline

1960s proposal

In the early 1960s, around the time Kenya, Tanganyika, Uganda and Zanzibar were gaining independence from the United Kingdom, the political leaders of the four nations had become interested in forming a federation. Julius Nyerere even offered in 1960 to delay the imminent independence of Tanganyika (due in 1961) in order for all of the East African territories to achieve independence together as a federation.

In June 1963, Kenyan Prime Minister Jomo Kenyatta met with the Tanganyikan President Julius Nyerere and Ugandan Prime Minister Milton Obote in Nairobi. The trio discussed the possibility of merging their three nations (plus Zanzibar) into a single East African Federation, declaring that this would be accomplished by the end of the year. Subsequently, discussions on the planning for such a union were initiated.

Privately, Kenyatta was more reluctant regarding the arrangement and as 1964 came around, the federation had not come to pass. In May 1964, Kenyatta rejected a back-benchers resolution calling for speedier federation. He publicly stated that talk of a federation had always been a ruse to hasten the pace of Kenyan independence from Britain, but Nyerere denied the veracity of this statement. Around the same time, Obote came out against an East African Federation, instead supporting pan-African unity, partly because of domestic political pressures with the semi-autonomous kingdom of Buganda's opposition to being in an East African federation as part of Uganda but rather as a unit in its own right.

By late 1964, the prospects for a wider East African federation had died, although Tanganyika and Zanzibar did form a union in April 1964, eventually becoming Tanzania.

It is speculated that colonial powers in Kenya, and the other nations joining the Federation, were incentivized to block the Federation even after these countries achieved decolonization. For Instance, in 1965, when the Federation initially fell through, Britain required Kenya that all facets of the settler economy be protected against neighboring countries (those attempting to conjoin with Kenya for the Federation). This posed a barrier to entry for Kenya and was one of several factors that prevented the Federation from unionizing in the 1960s.

2010s–2020s proposal, through the East African Community
In the early 2010s, a federation of the current East African Community into a single state began to be discussed, with early estimates of the founding of the federation in 2013. In 2010, the EAC launched its own common market within the region, with the goal of a common currency by 2013 and full political federation in 2015.

South Sudan was approved for membership of the EAC in March 2016, and acceded in September 2016. It would become the 6th member of the East African Federation. It is unclear how the potential accession of South Sudan to the EAC may affect the timeline for federation or the scope thereof, but given the infrastructure problems that persist in the fledgling country since South Sudanese President Salva Kiir Mayardit cut off oil commerce with Sudan, the South has decided to invest in constructing pipelines that circumvent Sudan's, which it had been using until that time. These new pipelines would extend through Ethiopia to the ports of Djibouti, as well as to the southeast to the coast of Kenya. These collaborations could increase the likelihood of South Sudan joining the East African Federation at some point.

On 14 October 2013, the leaders of Uganda, Kenya, Rwanda and Burundi began a meeting in Kampala intending to draft a constitution for the East African Federation, but by December 2014, efforts for a full political federation had been pushed back to 2016 or later.

In February 2016, Ugandan President Yoweri Museveni described the union as "the number one target that we should aim at". In November 2016, the EAC Council of Ministers agreed to create an East African Confederation before the East African Federation is eventually created.

In September 2018, a committee of regional constitutional experts and drafters was formed to begin the process of drafting a regional constitution. The committee, led by retired Ugandan Chief Justice Benjamin Odoki, met for a five-day consultation meeting in Burundi from 14–18 January 2020, where it announced that a confederation constitution would be drafted by the end of 2021. Following approval of the draft by the six EAC states after a year of consultations, the East African Confederation would be established by 2023. The road map towards a full political federation will be discussed in detail at future meetings.

In April 2020, Yoweri Museveni restated his desire for the culmination of the East African Federation in an address to the nation, reinforcing his stance that the East African Federation could provide political and economic benefits for the region.

On 29 March 2022, the East African Community Heads of State Summit held its 19th Ordinary Summit. The Democratic Republic of Congo was admitted into the EAC by the Summit's head of state unanimous decision. On 8 April 2022, the DRC officially acceded into the EAC and on 11 July 2022, DRC officially became a member of the EAC.

Leadership 
The EAC held its first Summit of East African Heads of State on November 30, 1993. Since then, they have held over 20 more such summits, laying out integration and objective plans for the eventual union of the nations. At these summits, there are many people in power stemming from the member states. The Summit Head of states, tasked with "giving strategic direction towards the realization of the goal and objectives of the Community," is made up of the presidents of the seven respective states. Also in attendance at these summits are the Council of Ministers, Coordinating Committee, the EAC "organs," and the heads of EAC's eventual institutions (these are listed in order of relative power, most to least). The Heads of State have appointed these roles, each performing a unique role within the conferences and region. The Democratic Republic of Congo does not yet have representation within this council due to the recency of their accession.

EAC Head of States 
The former president of Kenya, Uhuru Kenyatta, serves as the East African Communities lead Summit Chairperson. Paul Kagame, President of Rwanda, has served on this Head of States board since 2007 when Rwanda was admitted to the EAC (he has served as Rwanda's president since 2000). Évariste Ndayishimiye, President of Burundi, has served on the board since his election in 2020. Yoweri Museveni, President of Uganda, has served on the board since Uganda was admitted into the EAC in 2000. Samia Suluhu Hassan, President of Tanzania and the only woman on this board, has served as a Head of State since she was elected as president in 2021. Salva Kiir Mayardit, President of South Sudan, has served on this board since 2016, when South Sudan acceded to the EAC. Felix Tshisekedi will serve on this Head of States Board in the next summit after the Democratic Republic acceded in 2022.

Council of Ministers 
The Council of Ministers for the EAC meets twice a year, one time directly after the Summit and once later in the year. This group is tasked with applying the directives and changes decided upon at the summit to the greater East African Community. Betty Maina, a cabinet member for Uhuru Kenyatta in Kenya tasked as the Secretary for Industrialization, Trade and Enterprise Development in Kenya, is the current acting lead Council Chairperson. This position of Lead Council Chairperson is elected by the Head of State, and is replaced annually.

Coordinating committee 
The organs of the East African Community were established under Article 9 of the Treaty for the Establishment of the East African Community in November 2001. The main task here is to ensure cooperation between leaders from different regions, allowing for more efficient work. The current acting Principal Secretary of the Coordinating Committee is Dr. Kevit Desai of Kenya.

EAC organs 
The organs of the East African Community were established under Article 9 of the Treaty for the Establishment of the East African Community in November 2001. The positions are appointed by the Heads of Summits of the EAC, and all serve as legislators and mediators for the EAC and the preceding conferences leading to the treaty.

The highest-ranking member of the EAC Organs is the Honorary Dr. Peter Matuku Mathuki. Dr. Peter Matuku Mathuki is the current acting Secretary-General of the EAC, having been appointed on April 25, 2021, after years of serving on the East African Business Council. Within the EAC organs, the legislative system resides (the East African Court of Justice), composed of 5 individuals who settle disputes regarding the union of these nations. Justice Nestor Kayobera of Burundi has served as the court's president since being appointed in 2021. Other positions within the EAC Organs are the registrar of the East African Court of Justice, the position currently held by Yufnalis N. Okubo, the Counsel to the Community of the EAC, the position currently held by Dr. Anthony L. Kafumbe, the Director-General of Customs and Trades within the EAC, this position presently held by Kenneth A. Bagamuhunda, the Deputy Secretary-General of Productive and Social sectors, this position currently held by Hon. Christophe Bazivamo, and the Deputy Secretary-General of Planning and Infrastructure, Eng. Steven D.M. Mlote, currently help this position.

Heads of EAC Institutions 
There are currently seven Heads of EAC Institutions, all of which fulfill different roles in the region. Vivienne Yeda Apopo of Zambia is the current acting Director-General of East African Economic Development and has had this position since 2009. Dr. Novat Twungubumwe of Burundi is the current acting Attorney General and Executive Secretary East African Health Research Commission. Muyambi Fortunate of Uganda is the current Assistant General Executive Secretary of the East African Science and Technology Commission. Dr. James Otieno Jowi of Kenya is the serving Assistant General Executive Secretary of the East African Kiswahili Commission. Prof. Gaspard Banyankimbona of Uganda is the serving Executive Secretary of the Inter-University Council for East Africa. Emile Nguza Arao of Kenya is the serving Executive Director of the Civil Aviation Safety and Security Oversight Agency. Lilian K. Mukoronia of Kenya is the acting Registrar of the East African Community Competition Authority.

Benefits

Markets and trading 
A Customs Union was introduced in 2005, which would allow for free trade within the Federation, allowing for greater economic activity in the region if the Federation is ever implemented. A complementary union of goods and capital-labor laws was introduced in 2010, which would act similarly, standardizing the rules in the region pertaining to these facets of the economy and allowing for greater economic flexibility. Integration and standardization in these facets of the economy under one large Federation would make the area more economically appealing to a multinational corporation looking to operate in the region. Rather than needing to comply with each country's tax and fiscal policies, they would be dealing with one unified front, leading to lower operating costs in the region. Under the control of one president, a united front will also provide easier diplomatic processes for multinational companies to deal with. From this standpoint, the economic advantages of the Federation have been cited as a rationale for global powers such as the US not opposing the Federation. Uniting a front of 280 million people and $320 billion worth of gross domestic product would have an economic appeal. These plans will not take place until 2023.

These economic benefits are recognized by the people of these nations, leading to further support for the eventual union of these nations. A survey conducted in Tanzania revealed that a majority of respondents thought that the union of the EAC would better Trading opportunities in the region, and a majority also responded that the union would provide better job availability in the region.

Youth bulge 
The population of the constituent parts of the theoretical EAC is composed of 65% under 30-year-olds. This youth bulge is anticipated to grow to 75% of the population under the age of 25 in this region by 2030. Compared to the global percentage of the population that falls under the age of 25, which sits at 42% currently, this reflects the youth and opportunity of this region. Providing opportunities through the economically advantageous East African Community is paramount for the region and has been expressed as a driving force for the union.

Challenges

Ethnic and linguistic differences 
While the grouping of nations has adopted Swahili as their national language, there is a great deal of ethnolinguistic diversity within these groups. Different regional dialects and entirely different languages are spoken within the nations themselves, joining together, even more so when compared to one another. Tanzania achieved an ethnolinguistic score of 0.93 out of 1 by one study, ranking the highest out of 81 countries. Integrating a region where so many regional dialects are spoken will be difficult and could inhibit some of the economic benefits of the EAC.

Members' existing governments 
These countries also vary greatly in terms of the adoption of democracy. Rwanda practically has closed elections with Paul Kagame having served as the president for the past 22 years and garnering nearly 99% of the vote in the most recent presidential election to win his third term. In contrast, other member countries like Kenya host multi-party elections where the election is not as heavily corrupted. An even more significant concern for this Union is the unilateral lack of free governance throughout the seven nations. According to the Freedom House metric system, Kenya and Tanzania boast the highest Freedom scores of the seven nations and still only rank as partly free. Censorship of Media outlets, Restriction of voter rights, ballot fraud, and more instances of voter repression is present in all states. Merging nations with such corruption and anti-democratic establishments could pose a humanitarian crisis for the populations who could suffer from decreased freedoms and make cooperation amongst the different governing powers more difficult. A survey conducted in Tanzania revealed that 38% of respondents believed that the Union of EAC would make political corruption worse, while only 33% thought it would lessen political corruption.

Economic challenges 
While the union of these nations is recognized as economically advantageous, the mechanics of conforming to the EAC's standards has posed economic issues for some countries seeking to join the EAC. The economic prosperity of the nations attempting to join here varies greatly, with Burundi holding the lowest GDP at approximately US$ 3 billion, nearly 100 billion less than Kenya's GDP (US$ 98 billion). This discrepancy in wealth has impeded the less wealthy nations from conforming with some of the standards set for the EAC. For instance, South Sudan took four years to accede to the EAC and still fails to meet many of the criteria set for the Community. The South Sudanese president has asked for aid from fellow member countries to meet these standards, citing a lack of staffing at customs, immigration, and revenue/tax collection as the main source for failure to meet the standards of the EAC integration process. Member nations have not been quick to help; nations such as Kenya and Uganda are still charging visa fees on South Sudanese citizens, something EAC countries are supposed to be exempt from as part of the Customs Union.

Demographics

Population and fertility rate

Religion 
: Protestant 45.1% (Anglican 32.0%, Pentecostal/Born Again/Evangelical 11.1%, Seventh-day Adventist 1.7%, Baptist .3%), Roman Catholic 39.3%, Muslim 13.7%, other 1.6%, none 0.2%. (2014 census)

: Christian 85.5% (Protestant 33.4%, Catholic 20.6%, Evangelical 20.4%, African Instituted Churches 7%, other Christian 4.1%), Muslim 10.9%, other 1.8%, none 1.6%, don't know/no answer 0.2% (2019 census)

: Christian 63.1%, Muslim 34.1%, folk religion 1.1%, other 0.1%, unaffiliated 1.6% (2020 Pew research est.)

: Protestant 49.5% (includes Adventist 11.8% and other Protestant 37.7%), Roman Catholic 43.7%, Muslim 2%, other 0.9% (includes Jehovah's Witness), none 2.5%, unspecified 1.3% (2012 census)

: Roman Catholic 62.1%, Protestant 23.9% (includes Adventist 2.3% and other Protestant 21.6%), Muslim 2.5%, other 3.6%, unspecified 7.9% (2008 CIA est.)

: Christianity 60.5%, Islam 6.2%, Folk religions 32.9%, Others 0.5%. (2020 Pew research est.) Note: Last conducted census is a 2008 Sudanese census. Since the data is old, CIA does not provide data on the composition of the population, and Pew does not provide projections.

: Protestantism 48.1%, Catholicism 47.3%, 0.4% Other Christian, 1.8% Traditional Faiths, 1.5% Islam, 0.9% Others or None

: Christianity 77.64%, Islam 17.01%, Folk religions 3.38%, Unaffiliated 1.49%, Hindus 0.13%, Others 0.01%. (2020 Pew Research est.)

See also
 African Union
 List of proposed state mergers

Notes

References

Sources
 
 
 

2018 introductions
East Africa
Pan-Africanism in Africa
Proposed international organizations
Proposed political unions